Vígríðr or Vigrid  may refer to

Norse mythology
Vígríðr, a large field foretold to host a battle between the forces of the gods and the forces of Surtr as part of the events of Ragnarök.

Political organizations
Vigrid (Norway), neo-pagan and neo-Nazi organization in Norway.

Ships
, a Norwegian cargo ship in service 1915–17.